The Boston Library Society was an American subscription library established in New England's pre-eminent city, Boston, during 1792. Early subscribers included Revolutionary War figures Paul Revere and William Tudor. The society existed until 1939 when it merged into a larger historical library known as the Boston Athenæum.It has been maintained as an institution within the Athenaeum and conducts short Annual Meetings, within he Athenaeum's Annual meetings.It was founded fifteen years before the atheneum.

Brief history

1792–1858
The Boston Library "circulated polite general reading for ladies and gentlemen". It operated from rooms in the newly built Tontine Crescent, designed by Charles Bulfinch, who also served as one of the library's trustees.

Early subscribers, in addition to Revere and Tudor, included: Hannah Barrell, James Bowdoin III, Dr. Thomas Bulfinch, Rev. John Clarke of First Church, Abigail Howard, Sally Hubbard, Deborah Jeffries, Mary Langdon, Jedidiah Morse, Sarah Wentworth Apthorp Morton, James Perkins and Thomas Handasyd Perkins. The library maintained detailed records of its holdings and circulation activities. For instance, in 1794, Paul Revere borrowed works by Chevalier de Jean Francois Bourgoanne, Elizabeth Inchbald, James Cook, William Coxe, Elizabeth Craven, Charles-Marguerite-Jean-Baptiste Mercier Dupaty, Edward Gibbon, Alexander Jardine, Johann Kaspar Lavater, William Shakespeare, Joshua Townshend, and Comte de Volney. 

In the first years of the library, Nathan Webb served as secretary, 1794–1826. Henderson Inches, Allan Pollock, William Walter and Charles Hammatt were successive treasurers. Librarians included Caleb Bingham (1792–1797), Nathan Davies (1797–1803), Cyrus Perkins (1803–1806), James Day (1809–1811), Charles Callender (1813–1828), John Lee (1828–1840) and George S. Bulfinch (1840–ca.1845). Numerous trustees, in addition to Charles Bulfinch, supported the library through the years, including Reverend Joseph Eckley of Old South Meeting House, Reverend John Eliot, Reverend William Emerson, Samuel Hall, John Thornton Kirkland, George Richards Minot, Bishop Samuel Parker, William Scollay, Lemuel Shaw, William Spooner, Charles Vaughan and Redford Webster. In 1801, Abigail Howard donated some 500 books to the library.

By 1848, the library owned "about 11,000 volumes, which have been obtained chiefly by purchase".

Some of the titles in the library's collection in 1824 included:

 Marquis d'Argens' The Jewish Spy
 Asiatic Annual Register 1799–1810
 Jane Austen's Emma
 Babbler periodical essays
 Joanna Baillie's plays
 Henry Baker on Microscopes
 Mary Brunton's Emmeline
 Catherine Cuthbertson's Forest of Montalbano
 Dissenter's Magazine 1794–1799
 Dobson's Encyclopedia
 Fontenelle's Plurality of Worlds
 Mary Hays' Female Biography
 Benjamin Jenks' Meditations
 Soame Jenyns' Works
 Stephen Harriman Long's Expedition to the Rocky Mountains
 Lounger, a periodical work
 Lady Luxborough's Letters to Shenstone
 Catharine Macaulay's Letters on Education
 M'Call's History of Georgia
 William James MacNeven's Rambles in Switzerland
 Microcosm, a periodical work
 Philanthrope, a periodical paper
 Mrs. Ross' Physiognomist, a novel
 Rogers' Looker-On, a periodical paper
 Rowe's Lucan's Pharsalia
 Rowe's Present State of Europe, 1824
 Walter Scott's Peveril of the Peak
 Robert Southey's Metrical Tales
 Amos Stoddard's Sketches of Louisiana
 Mrs. West's Loyalists

1858–1939
In 1858, the Tontine Crescent was demolished, and so the Boston Library moved to new quarters in Essex Street. The library moved again in 1870, to Boylston Place; and yet again in 1904, to Newbury Street in the city's Back Bay neighborhood. In 1939 the society merged with the Boston Athenæum.

References

Further reading
 Catalogue of Books in the Boston Library, June, 1824; kept in the room over the arch, in Franklin-Place. Boston: Munroe and Francis, printers, 1824.
  Catalogue of the books of the Boston Library Society: in Franklin Place, January, 1844, Boston: T.R. Marvin, 1844.

1792 establishments in Massachusetts
Boston cultural history
Libraries in Financial District, Boston
Defunct organizations based in Massachusetts
18th century in Boston
19th century in Boston
Financial District, Boston
Subscription libraries in the United States
Former library buildings in the United States
Libraries established in 1792
Libraries disestablished in 1939